Operation 7 is the name given to a successful attempt to smuggle fourteen Jews from Germany into Switzerland using false papers in August and September 1942. The operation was devised by Abwehr members Hans von Dohnanyi and Wilhelm Canaris, and carried out with the support of Dohnanyi's brother-in-law Dietrich Bonhoeffer, who arranged visas and sponsors for the Jews. Originally, the plan included only seven Jews, but this was later increased to fourteen. The operation, which involved removing the Jews from deportation lists, making them agents of Abwehr and persuading Swiss officials to accept them, took over a year to plan and execute. 

In April 1943, the Gestapo arrested Bonhoeffer and Dohnanyi for their part in the scheme, which they had been alerted to because of the use of Abwehr funds in the operation. 

Bonhoeffer's involvement in Operation 7 was one of the pieces of evidence used by Stephen A. Wise in the petition for his inclusion in the Yad Vashem list of Righteous Among the Nations; this campaign was, however, unsuccessful.

References

Abwehr operations 
Rescue of Jews during the Holocaust
The Holocaust in Germany
1942 in Germany
1942 in Switzerland